The Brassicales (or Cruciales) are an order of flowering plants (anthophytes), belonging to the eurosids II group of dicotyledons under the APG II system. One character common to many members of the order is the production of glucosinolate (mustard oil) compounds. Most systems of classification have included this order, although sometimes under the name Capparales (the name chosen depending on which is thought to have priority).

The anthophytes are a grouping of plant taxa bearing flower-like reproductive structures. They were formerly thought to be a clade comprising plants bearing flower-like structures.  The group contained the angiosperms - the extant flowering plants, such as roses and grasses - as well as the Gnetales and the extinct Bennettitales.

23,420 species of vascular plant have been recorded in South Africa, making it the sixth most species-rich country in the world and the most species-rich country on the African continent. Of these, 153 species are considered to be threatened. Nine biomes have been described in South Africa: Fynbos, Succulent Karoo, desert, Nama Karoo, grassland, savanna, Albany thickets, the Indian Ocean coastal belt, and forests.

The 2018 South African National Biodiversity Institute's National Biodiversity Assessment plant checklist lists 35,130 taxa in the phyla Anthocerotophyta (hornworts (6)), Anthophyta (flowering plants (33534)), Bryophyta (mosses (685)), Cycadophyta (cycads (42)), Lycopodiophyta (Lycophytes(45)), Marchantiophyta (liverworts (376)), Pinophyta (conifers (33)), and Pteridophyta (cryptogams (408)).

Six families are represented in the literature. Listed taxa include species, subspecies, varieties, and forms as recorded, some of which have subsequently been allocated to other taxa as synonyms, in which cases the accepted taxon is appended to the listing. Multiple entries under alternative names reflect taxonomic revision over time.

Brassicaceae
Family: Brassicaceae,

Alyssum
Genus Alyssum:
 Alyssum minutum Schltdl. ex DC. not indigenous, naturalised

Aplanodes
Genus Aplanodes:
 Aplanodes doidgeana Marais, endemic
 Aplanodes sisymbrioides (Schltr.) Marais, indigenous

Arabidopsis
Genus Arabidopsis:
 Arabidopsis thaliana (L.) Heynh. not indigenous, naturalised

Barbarea
Genus Barbarea:
 Barbarea verna (Mill.) Asch. not indigenous, naturalised

Brachycarpaea
Genus Brachycarpaea:
 Brachycarpaea juncea (P.J.Bergius) Marais, accepted as Heliophila juncea (P.J.Bergius) Druce, endemic

Brassica
Genus Brassica:
 Brassica elongata Ehrh. subsp, elongata, not indigenous, naturalised
 Brassica juncea (L.) Czern. & Coss. not indigenous, naturalised
 Brassica nigra (L.) W.D.J.Koch, not indigenous, naturalised
 Brassica rapa L. not indigenous, naturalised
 Brassica tournefortii Gouan, not indigenous, naturalised, invasive

Camelina
Genus Camelina:
 Camelina rumelica Velen. not indigenous, naturalised

Capsella
Genus Capsella:
 Capsella bursa-pastoris (L.) Medik. not indigenous, naturalised

Cardamine
Genus Cardamine:
 Cardamine africana L. indigenous
 Cardamine flexuosa With. not indigenous, naturalised
 Cardamine hirsuta L. not indigenous, naturalised
 Cardamine impatiens L. not indigenous, naturalised
 Cardamine trichocarpa Hochst. ex A.Rich. indigenous
 Cardamine trichocarpa Hochst. ex A.Rich. subsp, trichocarpa, endemic

Cardaria
Genus Cardaria:
 Cardaria draba (L.) Desv. accepted as Lepidium draba L. not indigenous, naturalised

Chamira
Genus Chamira:
 Chamira circaeoides (L.f.) Zahlbr. endemic

Cheiranthus
Genus Cheiranthus:
 Cheiranthus linearis Thunb. accepted as Heliophila linearis DC. var, linearis, indigenous

Coronopus
Genus Coronopus:
 Coronopus didymus (L.) Sm. not indigenous, naturalised
 Coronopus integrifolius (DC.) Spreng. not indigenous, naturalised
 Lepidium coronopus (L.) Al-Shehbaz (formerly Coronopus squamatus (Forssk.) Asch.) not indigenous, naturalised

Crambe
Genus Crambe:
 Crambe hispanica L. not indigenous, naturalised

Cycloptychis
Genus Cycloptychis:
 Cycloptychis marlothii O.E.Schulz, accepted as Heliophila hurkana Al-Shehbaz & Mumm. endemic
 Cycloptychis virgata (Thunb.) E.Mey. ex Sond. accepted as Heliophila maraisiana Al-Shehbaz & Mumm. endemic

Descurainia
Genus Descurainia:
 Descurainia sophia (L.) Webb ex Prantl, not indigenous, naturalised

Diplotaxis
Genus Diplotaxis:
 Diplotaxis muralis (L.) DC. not indigenous, naturalised
 Diplotaxis muralis (L.) DC. subsp, muralis, not indigenous, naturalised

Eruca
Genus Eruca:
 Eruca sativa Mill. not indigenous, naturalised

Erucastrum
Genus Erucastrum:
 Erucastrum austroafricanum Al-Shehbaz & Warwick, indigenous
 Erucastrum griquense (N.E.Br.) O.E.Schulz, indigenous
 Erucastrum strigosum (Thunb.) O.E.Schulz, indigenous

Heliophila
Genus Heliophila:
 Heliophila acuminata (Eckl. & Zeyh.) Steud. endemic
 Heliophila adpressa O.E.Schulz, endemic
 Heliophila affinis Sond. endemic
 Heliophila africana (L.) Marais, endemic
 Heliophila alpina Marais, indigenous
 Heliophila amplexicaulis L.f. endemic
 Heliophila arenaria Sond. indigenous
 Heliophila arenaria Sond. var, acocksii Marais, endemic
 Heliophila arenaria Sond. var, agtertuinensis (O.E.Schulz) Marais, endemic
 Heliophila arenaria Sond. var, arenaria, endemic
 Heliophila arenaria Sond. var, glabrescens (O.E.Schulz) Marais, endemic
 Heliophila arenosa Schltr. endemic
 Heliophila brachycarpa Meisn. endemic
 Heliophila brassicifolia Eckl. & Zeyh. endemic
 Heliophila bulbostyla P.E.Barnes, endemic
 Heliophila callosa (L.f.) DC. endemic
 Heliophila carnosa (Thunb.) Steud. indigenous
 Heliophila cedarbergensis Marais, endemic
 Heliophila cinerea Marais, endemic
 Heliophila collina O.E.Schulz, endemic
 Heliophila concatenata Sond. endemic
 Heliophila cornellsbergia B.J.Pienaar & Nicholas, endemic
 Heliophila cornuta Sond. indigenous
 Heliophila cornuta Sond. var, cornuta, indigenous
 Heliophila cornuta Sond. var, squamata (Schltr.) Marais, indigenous
 Heliophila coronopifolia L. indigenous
 Heliophila crithmifolia Willd. indigenous
 Heliophila cuneata Marais, endemic
 Heliophila descurva Schltr. endemic
 Heliophila deserticola Schltr. var, deserticola, indigenous
 Heliophila deserticola Schltr. var, micrantha A.Schreib. indigenous
 Heliophila diffusa (Thunb.) DC. indigenous
 Heliophila diffusa (Thunb.) DC. var, diffusa, endemic
 Heliophila diffusa (Thunb.) DC. var, flacca (Sond.) Marais, endemic
 Heliophila digitata L.f. endemic
 Heliophila dregeana Sond. endemic
 Heliophila elata Sond. indigenous
 Heliophila elata Sond. var, elata, endemic
 Heliophila elata Sond. var, pillansii Marais, endemic
 Heliophila elongata (Thunb.) DC. endemic
 Heliophila ephemera P.A.Bean, endemic
 Heliophila esterhuyseniae Marais, endemic
 Heliophila eximia Marais, indigenous
 Heliophila filicaulis Marais, endemic
 Heliophila formosa Hilliard & B.L.Burtt, indigenous
 Heliophila gariepina Schltr. endemic
 Heliophila glauca Burch. ex DC. endemic
 Heliophila hurkana Al-Shehbaz & Mumm. endemic
 Heliophila juncea (P.J.Bergius) Druce, endemic
 Heliophila katbergensis Marais, endemic
 Heliophila laciniata Marais, endemic
 Heliophila lactea Schltr. indigenous
 Heliophila latisiliqua E.Mey. ex Sond. var, latisiliqua, accepted as Heliophila thunbergii (Eckl. & Zeyh.) Steud. var, thunbergii, present
 Heliophila latisiliqua E.Mey. ex Sond. var, macrostylis (E.Mey. ex Sond.) Marais, accepted as Heliophila thunbergii (Eckl. & Zeyh.) Steud. var, macrostylis (E.Mey. ex Sond.) B.Nord. present
 Heliophila leptophylla Schltr. endemic
 Heliophila linearifolia Burch. ex DC. var, filifolia Sond. accepted as Heliophila coronopifolia L.
 Heliophila linearis DC. endemic
 Heliophila linearis DC. var, linearifolia (Burch. ex DC.) Marais, endemic
 Heliophila linearis DC. var, linearis, endemic
 Heliophila linearis DC. var, reticulata (Eckl. & Zeyh.) Marais, endemic
 Heliophila linoides Schltr. endemic
 Heliophila macowaniana Schltr. endemic
 Heliophila macra Schltr. endemic
 Heliophila macrosperma Burch. ex DC. endemic
 Heliophila maraisiana Al-Shehbaz & Mumm. endemic
 Heliophila meyeri Sond. indigenous
 Heliophila meyeri Sond. var, meyeri, endemic
 Heliophila meyeri Sond. var, minor Marais, endemic
 Heliophila minima (Stephens) Marais, indigenous
 Heliophila monosperma Al-Shehbaz & Mumm. endemic
 Heliophila namaquana Bolus, endemic
 Heliophila namaquensis (Marais) Al-Shehbaz & Mumm. endemic
 Heliophila nubigena Schltr. endemic
 Heliophila patens Oliv. endemic
 Heliophila pectinata Burch. ex DC. endemic
 Heliophila pendula Willd. endemic
 Heliophila pinnata L.f. endemic
 Heliophila promontorii Marais, endemic
 Heliophila pubescens Burch. ex Sond. endemic
 Heliophila pusilla L.f. indigenous
 Heliophila pusilla L.f. var, lanceolata (Adamson) Marais, endemic
 Heliophila pusilla L.f. var, macrosperma Marais, endemic
 Heliophila pusilla L.f. var, pusilla, endemic
 Heliophila pusilla L.f. var, setacea (Schltr.) Marais, endemic
 Heliophila ramosissima O.E.Schulz, endemic
 Heliophila refracta Sond. endemic
 Heliophila remotiflora O.E.Schulz, endemic
 Heliophila rigidiuscula Sond. indigenous
 Heliophila rimicola Marais, endemic
 Heliophila scandens Harv. endemic
 Heliophila schulzii Marais, endemic
 Heliophila scoparia Burch. ex DC. indigenous
 Heliophila scoparia Burch. ex DC. var, aspera (Schltr.) Marais, endemic
 Heliophila scoparia Burch. ex DC. var, scoparia, endemic
 Heliophila seselifolia Burch. ex DC. indigenous
 Heliophila seselifolia Burch. ex DC. var, marlothii (O.E.Schulz) Marais, endemic
 Heliophila seselifolia Burch. ex DC. var, nigellifolia (Schltr.) Marais, endemic
 Heliophila seselifolia Burch. ex DC. var, seselifolia, indigenous
 Heliophila suavissima Burch. ex DC. indigenous
 Heliophila suborbicularis Al-Shehbaz & Mumm. endemic
 Heliophila subulata Burch. ex DC. endemic
 Heliophila tabularis Wolley-Dod, endemic
 Heliophila thunbergii (Eckl. & Zeyh.) Steud. indigenous
 Heliophila thunbergii (Eckl. & Zeyh.) Steud. var, macrostylis (E.Mey. ex Sond.) B.Nord. endemic
 Heliophila thunbergii (Eckl. & Zeyh.) Steud. var, thunbergii, endemic
 Heliophila tricuspidata Schltr. endemic
 Heliophila trifurca Burch. ex DC. indigenous
 Heliophila tulbaghensis Schinz, endemic
 Heliophila variabilis Burch. ex DC. indigenous

Hirschfeldia
Genus Hirschfeldia:
 Hirschfeldia incana (L.) Lagr.-Foss. not indigenous, naturalised

Hymenolobus
Genus Hymenolobus:
 Hymenolobus procumbens (L.) Nutt. in Torr. & A.Gray, not indigenous, naturalised

Lepidium
Genus Lepidium:
 Lepidium africanum (Burm.f.) DC. indigenous
 Lepidium africanum (Burm.f.) DC. subsp, africanum, indigenous
 Lepidium africanum (Burm.f.) DC. subsp, divaricatum (Aiton) Jonsell, indigenous
 Lepidium basuticum Marais, indigenous
 Lepidium bipinnatum Thunb. endemic
 Lepidium bonariense L. not indigenous, naturalised
 Lepidium campestre R.Br. not indigenous, naturalised
 Lepidium capense Thunb. endemic
 Lepidium desertorum Eckl. & Zeyh. indigenous
 Lepidium draba L. not indigenous, naturalised, invasive
 Lepidium ecklonii Schrad. endemic
 Lepidium flexuosum Thunb. endemic
 Lepidium mossii Thell. endemic
 Lepidium myriocarpum Sond. indigenous
 Lepidium pinnatum Thunb. endemic
 Lepidium schinzii Thell. indigenous
 Lepidium schlechteri Thell. endemic
 Lepidium suluense Marais, indigenous
 Lepidium transvaalense Marais, indigenous
 Lepidium trifurcum Sond. indigenous
 Lepidium virginicum L. not indigenous, naturalised

Lobularia
Genus Lobularia:
 Lobularia maritima (L.) Desv. not indigenous, naturalised

Matthiola
Genus Matthiola:
 Matthiola bicornis (Sibth. & Sm.) DC. not indigenous, naturalised
 Matthiola incana (L.) R.Br. not indigenous, naturalised
 Matthiola torulosa (Thunb.) DC. indigenous

Nasturtium
Genus Nasturtium:
 Nasturtium officinale R.Br. not indigenous, naturalised, invasive

Raphanus
Genus Raphanus:
 Raphanus raphanistrum L. not indigenous, naturalised, invasive
 Raphanus sativus L. not indigenous, cultivated, naturalised

Rapistrum
Genus Rapistrum:
 Rapistrum rugosum (L.) All. not indigenous, naturalised, invasive

Rorippa
Genus Rorippa:
 Rorippa fluviatilis (E.Mey. ex Sond.) Thell. indigenous
 Rorippa fluviatilis (E.Mey. ex Sond.) Thell. var, caledonica (Sond.) Marais, indigenous
 Rorippa fluviatilis (E.Mey. ex Sond.) Thell. var, fluviatilis, indigenous
 Rorippa madagascariensis (DC.) Hara, indigenous
 Rorippa nasturtium-aquaticum (L.) Hayek, accepted as Nasturtium officinale R.Br. not indigenous, naturalised
 Rorippa nudiuscula Thell. indigenous

Schlechteria
Genus Schlechteria:
 Schlechteria capensis Bolus, accepted as Heliophila monosperma Al-Shehbaz & Mumm. endemic

Silicularia
Genus Silicularia:
 Silicularia polygaloides (Schltr.) Marais, accepted as Heliophila polygaloides Schltr. endemic

Sinapis
Genus Sinapis:
 Sinapis alba L. not indigenous, naturalised
 Sinapis arvensis L. not indigenous, naturalised

Sisymbrium
Genus Sisymbrium:
 Sisymbrium burchellii DC. indigenous
 Sisymbrium burchellii DC. var, burchellii, indigenous
 Sisymbrium capense Thunb. indigenous
 Sisymbrium irio L. not indigenous, naturalised
 Sisymbrium officinale (L.) Scop. not indigenous, naturalised
 Sisymbrium orientale L. not indigenous, naturalised
 Sisymbrium thellungii O.E.Schulz, accepted as Erucastrum austroafricanum Al-Shehbaz & Warwick, indigenous
 Sisymbrium turczaninowii Sond. indigenous

Thlaspeocarpa
Genus Thlaspeocarpa:
 Thlaspeocarpa capensis (Sond.) C.A.Sm. accepted as Heliophila suborbicularis Al-Shehbaz & Mumm. present
 Thlaspeocarpa namaquensis Marais, accepted as Heliophila namaquensis (Marais) Al-Shehbaz & Mumm. present

Thlaspi
Genus Thlaspi:
 Thlaspi arvense L. not indigenous, naturalised

Turritis
Genus Turritis:
 Turritis glabra L. not indigenous, naturalised

Capparaceae
Family: Capparaceae,

Bachmannia
Genus Bachmannia:
 Bachmannia woodii (Oliv.) Gilg, endemic

Boscia
Genus Boscia:
 Boscia albitrunca (Burch.) Gilg & Gilg-Ben. indigenous
 Boscia angustifolia A.Rich. var, corymbosa (Gilg) DeWolf, indigenous
 Boscia filipes Gilg, accepted as Boscia foetida Schinz subsp, filipes (Gilg) Lotter, present
 Boscia foetida Schinz, indigenous
 Boscia foetida Schinz subsp, filipes (Gilg) Lotter, indigenous
 Boscia foetida Schinz subsp, foetida, indigenous
 Boscia foetida Schinz subsp, longipedicellata (Gilg) Toelken, endemic
 Boscia foetida Schinz subsp, minima Toelken, indigenous
 Boscia foetida Schinz subsp, rehmanniana (Pestal.) Toelken, indigenous
 Boscia mossambicensis Klotzsch, indigenous
 Boscia oleoides (Burch. ex DC.) Toelken, endemic

Cadaba
Genus Cadaba:
 Cadaba aphylla (Thunb.) Wild, indigenous
 Cadaba natalensis Sond. indigenous
 Cadaba termitaria N.E.Br. indigenous

Capparis
Genus Capparis:
 Capparis brassii DC. indigenous
 Capparis fascicularis DC. indigenous
 Capparis fascicularis DC. var, fascicularis, indigenous
 Capparis fascicularis DC. var, zeyheri (Turcz.) Toelken, endemic
 Capparis sepiaria L. indigenous
 Capparis sepiaria L. var, citrifolia (Lam.) Toelken, indigenous
 Capparis sepiaria L. var, subglabra (Oliv.) DeWolf, indigenous
 Capparis tomentosa Lam. indigenous

Cladostemon
Genus Cladostemon:
 Cladostemon kirkii (Oliv.) Pax & Gilg, indigenous

Courbonia
Genus Courbonia:
 Courbonia edulis Gilg & Gilg-Ben. accepted as Maerua edulis (Gilg & Gilg-Ben.) DeWolf, present

Maerua
Genus Maerua:
 Maerua angolensis DC. indigenous
 Maerua angolensis DC. subsp, angolensis, indigenous
 Maerua brevipetiolata Killick, indigenous
 Maerua cafra (DC.) Pax, indigenous
 Maerua decumbens (Brongn.) DeWolf, indigenous
 Maerua edulis (Gilg & Gilg-Ben.) DeWolf, indigenous
 Maerua gilgii Schinz, indigenous
 Maerua juncea Pax, indigenous
 Maerua juncea Pax subsp, crustata (Wild) Wild, indigenous
 Maerua nervosa (Hochst.) Oliv. endemic
 Maerua parvifolia Pax, indigenous
 Maerua racemulosa (A.DC.) Gilg & Gilg-Ben. indigenous
 Maerua rosmarinoides (Sond.) Gilg & Gilg-Ben. indigenous
 Maerua schinzii Pax, indigenous

Thilachium
Genus Thilachium:
 Thilachium africanum Lour. indigenous

Cleomaceae
Family: Cleomaceae,

Cleome
Genus Cleome:
 Cleome angustifolia Forssk. indigenous
 Cleome angustifolia Forssk. subsp, diandra (Burch.) Kers, indigenous
 Cleome angustifolia Forssk. subsp, petersiana (Klotzsch ex Sond.) Kers, indigenous
 Cleome bororensis (Klotzsch) Oliv. indigenous
 Cleome conrathii Burtt Davy, indigenous
 Cleome foliosa Hook.f. indigenous
 Cleome foliosa Hook.f. var, lutea (Sond.) Codd & Kers, indigenous
 Cleome gynandra L. indigenous
 Cleome hassleriana Chodat, accepted as Tarenaya hassleriana (Chodat) Iltis, not indigenous, naturalised, invasive
 Cleome hirta (Klotzsch) Oliv. indigenous
 Cleome kalachariensis (Schinz) Gilg & Gilg-Ben. indigenous
 Cleome macrophylla (Klotzsch) Briq. indigenous
 Cleome maculata (Sond.) Szyszyl. indigenous
 Cleome monophylla L. indigenous
 Cleome oxyphylla Burch. indigenous
 Cleome oxyphylla Burch. var, oxyphylla, indigenous
 Cleome oxyphylla Burch. var, robusta Kers, endemic
 Cleome paxii (Schinz) Gilg & Gilg-Ben. indigenous
 Cleome rubella Burch. indigenous
 Cleome schlechteri Briq. endemic

Tarenaya
Genus Tarenaya:
 Tarenaya hassleriana (Chodat) Iltis, not indigenous, naturalised, invasive

Resedaceae
Family: Resedaceae,

Oligomeris
Genus Oligomeris:
 Oligomeris dipetala (Aiton) Turcz. indigenous
 Oligomeris dipetala (Aiton) Turcz. var, dipetala, indigenous
 Oligomeris dregeana (Mull.Arg.) Mull.Arg. indigenous

Reseda
Genus Reseda:
 Reseda lutea L. not indigenous, naturalised, invasive
 Reseda lutea L. subsp, lutea var, nutans, not indigenous, naturalised, invasive

Salvadoraceae
Family: Salvadoraceae,

Azima
Genus Azima:
 Azima tetracantha Lam. indigenous

Salvadora
Genus Salvadora:
 Salvadora australis Schweick. indigenous
 Salvadora persica L. indigenous
 Salvadora persica L. var, persica, indigenous
 Salvadora persica L. var, pubescens Brenan, indigenous

Tropaeolaceae
Family: Tropaeolaceae,

Tropaeolum
Genus Tropaeolum:
 Tropaeolum majus L. not indigenous, cultivated, naturalised, invasive
 Tropaeolum speciosum Poepp. & Endl. not indigenous, naturalised, invasive

References

South African plant biodiversity lists
Brassicales